Bazar Jomeh (also Romanized as Bāzār Jom‘eh; also known as Dzhuma-Bazar and Bāzār Jom‘eh-ye Shānderman) is a city in and the capital of Shanderman District, Masal County, Gilan Province, Iran. In 2006, it had a population of 3,866.

References

Populated places in Masal County

Cities in Gilan Province